Larry Gene Hayes Sr. (July 21, 1935  June 15, 2017) was a professional American football player who played linebacker for the New York Giants and Los Angeles Rams.

References

1935 births
2017 deaths
Players of American football from Nashville, Tennessee
American football linebackers
Los Angeles Rams players
New York Giants players
Ottawa Rough Riders players
Vanderbilt Commodores football players
People from Old Hickory, Tennessee